The Stockbridge Four Corners Bridge is a steel girder bridge carrying Vermont Route 100 across the White River near the village of Stockbridge Four Corners in Stockbridge, Vermont.  The bridge is a 2009 replacement for 1929 Pratt through truss bridge, which was listed on the National Register of Historic Places in 1991.  The historic bridge replaced an older covered bridge destroyed by Vermont's devastating 1927 floods.

Site and modern bridge
The bridge site is locate just southwest of the village of Stockbridge Four Corners, which is formed by a right-angle turn of Vermont Route 100 and its junction with Stockbridge Common Road and Blackmer Boulevard.  Vermont 100 runs west from the junction, and then crosses the river before bending to parallel the river running further southwest.  The present bridge, constructed in 2008-2009, is a steel girder bridge whose deck is integrated into its abutments.  The bridge is curved to accommodate the transition from the crossing to the southwest continuation of the roadway.

Historic bridges
Early bridges were built on the site by the town.  A covered bridge was washed away from the site by Vermont's devastating floods of 1927, which caused particularly severe damage in the White River valley.  In 1929, the state retained the Berlin Construction Company to build a Pratt through truss at the site; it was built out of steel I-beams and placed on rubblestone abutments that were later reinforced with concrete footings.  It was of a standardized design developed by the state in the wake of the floods to more effectively produce the many bridges requiring replacement.

See also
National Register of Historic Places listings in Windsor County, Vermont
List of bridges on the National Register of Historic Places in Vermont

References

Road bridges on the National Register of Historic Places in Vermont
National Register of Historic Places in Windsor County, Vermont
Bridges completed in 1929
Bridges in Windsor County, Vermont
Buildings and structures in Stockbridge, Vermont
Steel bridges in the United States
Girder bridges in the United States